Stigmella hisaii is a moth of the family Nepticulidae. It is found in Japan.

The larvae feed on Castanopsis cuspidata. They probably mine the leaves of their host.

External links
Japanese Moths

Nepticulidae
Moths of Japan
Moths described in 2004